Italian journalist Marco Zeni was the first to uncover the suppressed secret of Benito Mussolini's first marriage to Ida Dalser, in which the two had a son, Benito Albino Mussolini. His story was publicized through a documentary and two books, L'ultimo filò and La moglie di Mussolini.

See also 

Benito Mussolini
Ida Dalser
Benito Albino Mussolini

References

Italian journalists
Italian male journalists